Ivan Aleksandrovich Bagration (1730–1795), born Ivane Bagrationi, was a Georgian royal prince (batonishvili) of the Bagrationi dynasty from the House of Mukhrani. Prince Ivan was a Second-Major of the Russian army although he did not know the Russian language and retired very early. He served at Kizlyar fortress.

Early life
He was born in Iran and was the son of Prince Alexander of Kartli. His father moved to Russia in 1757 and was promoted to lieutenant colonel of the Russian imperial army. His brother Kirill was a major-general of the Russian army and a member of the Governing Senate.

Tombstone
The tombstone of Prince Ivan is located at Vsesvyatskoye Church (Храм Всех Святых во Всехсвятском) in Moscow. The monument was placed on his grave personally by his son General and Prince Pyotr Bagration. The monument is a fluted pyramid on a high pedestal. The Tombstone of Prince Ivan has changed position repeatedly. Now it is set in the north of the temple near the memorial of "Reconciliation of Peoples." Tombstone of Ivan Bagration refers to the history of the monuments and is of federal significance.

Family
Prince Ivan married a woman from Georgian nobility and had three sons:

 Pyotr Bagration (1765–1812), General in the Russian Army
 Alexander Bagration (1771–1820)
 Roman Bagration (1778–1834), General in the Russian Army

References

 Петр Долгоруков - "Россииская родословная книга" - ч. II - СПб 1855 - стр.5-14
 Генерал Багратион. Жизнь и война Анисимов, Евгений
 Елена Лебедева. Храм Всех Святых в селе Всехсвятском. Православие.Ru
 Памятники архитектуры Москвы. Окрестности старой Москвы (северо-западная и северная части территории от Камер-Коллежского вала до нынешней границы города) — М.: Искусство — XXI век, 2004. — С. 144—146.
 Храм Всех Святых на Соколе, некрополь Багратионов, крест и плиты погибшим от красного террора Храмы России

1730 births
1795 deaths
House of Mukhrani
Georgian princes
Iranian people of Georgian descent